Le Chant Des Bauls - Manuche O Rautan is a 2002 Bengali Baul song album by Paban Das Baul, Gour Khyapa, Nimai Goswami and Mimlu Sen. It was released by Brussels based Belgian record company Fonti Musicali on 23 September in 2002.

Background

References

External links
 
 
 

2002 albums
Paban Das Baul albums